Seeso was an over-the-top subscription streaming service owned by Comcast through NBCUniversal, launched on January 7, 2016, and closed on November 8, 2017. It provided comedy content such as original and broadcast television shows.

History 
On December 2, 2014, Evan Shapiro joined NBCUniversal as the Executive Vice President of the newly formed NBCUniversal Digital Enterprises division of NBCUniversal Cable Entertainment Group after his job at Pivot to work on a digital project for the division.

On October 15, 2015, Seeso was officially announced with certain titles in its library. On December 3, Seeso was launched in an open beta that lasted from December 3, 2015 to January 6, 2016. Seeso was officially launched the day after.

On September 30, 2016, Seeso announced its first event called the "Stand-Up Streaming Fest", in which a title of comedy content would become available within a week, bringing a total of 12 specials for 12 weeks.

On May 3, 2017, Evan Shapiro announced his departure from the company. He was replaced by Maggie Suniewick, president of NBCU digital enterprises.

On August 9, 2017, Seeso announced via its Facebook page that the service would be shutting down by the end of 2017.

On November 8, 2017, Seeso shut down its streaming service.

Content 
Seeso offered comedy shows, including Saturday Night Live, The Tonight Show Starring Jimmy Fallon, The Office (UK), Parks and Recreation, The Kids in the Hall, Fancy Boy, and Monty Python.

Original series

Co-productions
These shows have been commissioned by Seeso in cooperation with a partner from another country.

Specials

Approximately coinciding with the August announcement of Seeso's impending shutdown, four of its originals – The Cyanide & Happiness Show, HarmonQuest, Hidden America with Jonah Ray, and My Brother, My Brother and Me were removed and transferred to the VRV streaming service. There's... Johnny!, a sitcom which had been produced for Seeso but not yet aired, was transferred to Hulu.

See also 
 Peacock
 Hayu
 NBC Sports Gold
 Hulu
 Craftsy
 Night Flight Plus
 YouTube Premium
 List of streaming media services

References

External links 
 

Defunct video on demand services
Defunct subscription services
NBCUniversal
Internet properties established in 2016
American comedy websites
2016 establishments in the United States
2017 disestablishments in the United States
Internet properties disestablished in 2017